Charles Wyndham or Windham may refer to:

Politicians
Charles Wyndham, 2nd Earl of Egremont (1710–1763), British peer and MP
Charles William Wyndham (1760–1828), English MP for Midhurst 1790–95, New Shoreham 1795–1802, and Sussex 1807–1812
Charles Wyndham (1796–1866), English Member of Parliament (MP) for West Sussex 1841–1847	
Charles Wyndham, 3rd Baron Leconfield (1872–1952), British peer
Sir Charles Wyndham (1638–1706), MP for Southampton 1679–89 and 1689–98 and St Ives 1698–1701
Sir Charles Ash Windham (1810–1870), British Army officer and MP
 Charles Edwin (died 1801), born Charles Wyndham, MP for Glamorgan 1780–89

Others
Charles Wyndham (actor) (1837–1919), British actor (who assumed the name)

See also
Wyndham (disambiguation)